Although Australia is mostly arid, the nation is a major agricultural producer and exporter, with over 325,300 employed in agriculture, forestry and fishing as of February 2015. Agriculture and its closely related sectors earn $155 billion-a-year for a 12% share of GDP. Farmers and grazers own 135,997 farms, covering 61% of Australia's landmass. Across the country there is a mix of irrigation and dry-land farming.  The success of Australia to become a major agricultural power despite the odds is facilitated by its policies of long-term visions and promotion of agricultural reforms that greatly increased the country's agricultural industry.

The CSIRO, the federal government agency for scientific research in Australia, has forecast that climate change will cause decreased precipitation over much of Australia and that this will exacerbate existing challenges to water availability and quality for agriculture.

There are three main zones: the high rainfall zone of Tasmania and a narrow coastal zone (used principally for dairying and beef production); wheat, sheep zone (cropping (principally winter crops), and the grazing of sheep (for wool, lamb and mutton) plus beef cattle) and the pastoral zone (characterised by low rainfall, less fertile soils, and large scale pastoral activities involving the grazing of beef cattle and sheep for wool and mutton). An indicator of the viability of agriculture in the state of South Australia is whether the land is within Goyder's Line.

History
Agriculture in Australia has a lively history. Aboriginal Australians have been various described as hunter-gatherer-cultivators and proto-farmers, as there is evidence that farming activities were undertaken prior to the arrival of Europeans, including tilling, planting and irrigating. However, these practices were non-industrialised and complementary to hunting, gathering and fishing. Whether the people could be termed agriculturalists is controversial. In 1788, the first European settlers brought agricultural technology from their homelands which radically changed the dominant practices. After some initial failures, wool dominated in the 19th century and, in the first half of the 20th century, dairying increased in its popularity driven by technological changes like canning and refrigeration.

Meat exports were very significant in the development of Australian agriculture. By 1925 there were 54 export freezing works, capable of killing 6000 cattle and 90,000 sheep and lambs daily. Initially meat for British markets had to be frozen, but later beef could be exported chilled.

Production

Australia's main agricultural products are very contrasting crops: sugar cane (typical of tropical countries), wheat and barley (typical of cold countries). In 2018, Australia was the world's largest producer of lupin bean (714 thousand tons), the world's second largest producer of chickpeas (1 million tons), the world's fourth largest producer of barley (9.2 million tons) and oats (1.2 million tons), the 5th largest producer of rapeseed (3.9 million tons), the 9th largest producer of sugarcane (33.5 million tons) and wheat (20.9 million tons) and the 13th largest world producer of grape (1.66 million tons). In the same year, the country also produced 1.2 million tons of sorghum, 1.1 million tons of potato, in addition to smaller productions of other agricultural products, such as rice (635 thousand tons), maize (387 thousand tons), tomato (386 thousand tons), orange (378 thousand tons), fava beans (377 thousand tons), banana (373 thousand tons), pea (317 thousand tons), carrot (284 thousand tons), onion (278 thousand tons), apple (268 thousand tons), lentils (255 thousand tons), melon (224 thousand tons), watermelon (181 thousand tons), tangerine (138 thousand tons) etc.

Major agricultural products 
Australia produces a large variety of primary products for export and domestic consumption. The forecast top ten agricultural products by value are listed for the year 2006–07, with production figures from previous years.

Crops

Cereals, oilseeds and grain legumes are produced on a large scale in Australia for human consumption and livestock feed.  Wheat is the cereal with the greatest production in terms of area and value to the Australian economy. Sugarcane, grown in tropical Australia, is also an important crop; however, the unsubsidised industry (while lower-cost than heavily subsidised European and American sugar producers) is struggling to compete with the huge and much more efficient Brazilian sugarcane industry.

Horticulture

In 2005 McDonald's Australia Ltd announced it would no longer source all its potatoes for fries from Tasmanian producers and announced a new deal with New Zealand suppliers. Subsequently, Vegetable and Potato Growers Australia (Ltd.) launched a political campaign advocating protectionism.

Viticulture

Although the Australian wine industry enjoyed a large period of growth during the 1990s, over planting and oversupply led to a large drop in the value of wine, forcing out of business some winemakers, especially those on contracts to large wine-producing companies. At the time, the future for some Australian wine producers seemed uncertain, but by 2015 a national study showed that the industry had recovered and the combined output of grape growing and winemaking were major contributors to the Australian economy's gross output while the associated industry of wine tourism had also expanded. A follow-up report from 2019 demonstrated further consolidation, by which stage wine had become Australia's fifth-largest agricultural export industry with domestic and international sales contributing AU$45.5 billion to gross output.

Animal products

Beef industry
The beef industry is the largest agricultural enterprise in Australia, and it is the second largest beef exporter, behind Brazil, in the world. All states and territories of Australia support cattle breeding in a wide range of climates. Cattle production is a major industry that covers an area in excess of 200 million hectares. The Australian beef industry is dependent on export markets, with over 60% of Australian beef production exported, primarily to the United States, Korea and Japan.

In southern Australia (NSW, Victoria, Tasmania, South Australia and south-western Western Australia) beef cattle are often reared on smaller properties as part of a mixed farming or grazing operation, but some properties do specialise in producing cattle. The southern calves are typically reared on pasture and sold as weaners, yearlings or as steers at about two years old or older. Artificial insemination and embryo transfer are more commonly used in stud cattle breeding in Australia, but may be used in other herds.

In the Top End, sub-tropical areas and in arid inland regions cattle are bred on native pastures on expansive cattle stations. Anna Creek Station in South Australia, Australia is the world's largest working cattle station. The North Australian Pastoral Company Pty Limited (NAPCO) is now one of Australia's largest beef cattle producers, with a herd of over 180,000 cattle and fourteen cattle stations in Queensland and the Northern Territory. The Australian Agricultural Company (AA Co) manages a cattle herd of more than 585,000 head. Heytesbury Beef Pty Ltd owns and manages over 200,000 head of cattle across eight stations spanning the East Kimberley, Victoria River and Barkly Tablelands regions in Northern Australia.

Prior to European settlement there were no cattle in Australia. The present herd consists principally of British and European breeds (Bos taurus), in the southern regions with Aberdeen Angus and Herefords being the most common. In northern Australia Bos indicus breeds predominate along with their crosses. They were introduced to combine the resistance to cattle ticks and greater tolerance of hot weather.

In 1981, the industry was shaken by the Australian meat substitution scandal, which revealed that horse and kangaroo meat had been both exported overseas and sold domestically as beef.

Despite strong public opposition (a petition carrying 200,000 signatures of people opposed to live export was tabled in parliament)and opposition from the RSPCA because of cruelty, the export of live cattle continues.

Pork industry

Dairy

Domestic milk markets were heavily regulated until the 1980s, particularly for milk used for domestic fresh milk sales. This protected smaller producers in the northern states who produced exclusively for their local markets. The Kerin Plan (named after politician John Kerin) began the process of deregulation in 1986. The final price supports were removed in 2000 with the assistance of Pat Rowley, head of the Australian Dairy Farmers Federation and the Australian Dairy Industry Council. Deregulation ultimately saw 13,000 Australian dairy farmers produce 10 billion litres of milk in comparison to the 5 billion litres of milk produced by 23,000 farmers prior to deregulation, a 30% reduction in farmers with a 55% rise in milk production. As the Australian dairy industry grows feedlot systems are becoming more popular.

Fisheries
 The fisheries in Australia is a very large scale industry. Australia produces many species of fish including farmed, sustainable and intensive and wild caught such as tuna and other schooling fish.

Wool

Animal rights organisations including PETA are currently promoting a boycott of Australian, and all Merino wool, as a protest against the practice of mulesing, a procedure used to prevent the animals from becoming fly blown with maggots. In 2004, due to the worldwide attention, AWI proposed to phase out the practice by the end of year 2010; this promise was retracted in 2009.

Seaweeds
The shorelines, especially the Great Barrier Reef, are providing motivation to help the continent by using seaweed (algae) to absorb nutrients. Because of the giant number of natural Australian seaweeds, not only could seaweed cultivation be used to help absorb nutrients around the GBR and other Australian shores, cultivation could also help feed a large part of the world. Even the Chinese, who could be considered far more advanced in seaweed cultivation, are interested in the future of Australian seaweeds. Lastly, the GBR itself, because of the delicate corals, has lent itself to utilizing seaweed/algae purposely as a nutrient reduction tool in the form of algae.

Olives
Olives have been grown in Australia since the early 1800s. Olive trees were planted by the warden of the self-funded penal settlement on St Helena Island, Queensland in Moreton Bay. Between 2009 and 2014 Australia imported an average of  predominantly from Spain, Italy and Greece. China olive oil consumption is increasing and Chinese investors have begun to buy Australian olive farms. Olive cultivars include Arbequina, Arecuzzo, Barnea, Barouni, Coratina, Correggiola, Del Morocco, Frantoio, Hojiblanca, Jumbo Kalamata, Kalamata, Koroneiki, Leccino, Manzanillo, Pendulino, Picholine, Picual, Sevillano, UC13A6, and Verdale. Manzanillo, Azapa, Nab Tamri and South Australian Verdale for the production of table olives.

Importance of irrigation

Because of Australia's large deserts and irregular rainfall, irrigation is necessary for agriculture in some parts of the country. The total gross value of irrigated agricultural production in 2004-05 was A$9,076 million compared to A$9,618 million in 2000–01. The gross value of irrigated agricultural production represents around a quarter (23%) of the gross value of agricultural commodities produced in Australia in 2004–05, on less than 1% of agricultural land.

Of the 12,191 GL of water consumed by agriculture in 2004–05, dairy farming accounted for 18% (2,276 GL), pasture 16% (1,928 GL), cotton 15% (1,822 GL) and sugar 10% (1,269 GL).

Genetic modification
GM grains are widely grown in all states and territories in Australia with the exception of Tasmania, which is the last state to maintain a moratorium against GM. GM crops are regulated under a national scheme by the Gene Technology Regulator, through the Gene Technology Act 2000. As of 2022, there are four GM crops approved to be grown in Australia: cotton, safflower, carnations and canola. In particular, 99.5% of cotton growers in Australia use GM cotton.

Issues facing Australian agriculture

Political values
Historian F.K. Crowley finds that:
 Australian farmers and their spokesman have always considered that life on the land is inherently more virtuous, more healthy, more important and more productive, than living in the towns and cities. The farmers complained that something was wrong with an electoral system which produced parliamentarians who spent money beautifying vampire-cities instead of developing the interior.

The Country Party, from the 1920s to the 1970s, promulgated its version of agrarianism, which it called "countrymindedness".  The goal was to enhance the status of the graziers (operators of big sheep ranches) and small farmers and justified subsidies for them.

Technical, environmental and economic issues
The agricultural industry is one of the most trade-exposed sectors of the Australian economy.

Organic farming
As of 2021, $2.3 billion worth of commodities were produced in Australia by the organic agriculture sector, representing approximately 3% of agricultural output. 
Australia leads the world with 35 million hectares certified organic, which is 8.8% of Australia's agricultural land and Australia now accounts for more than half (51%) of the world's certified organic agriculture hectares.

Foreign land ownership
Australia has seen a major increase in foreign ownership of agriculture in the 2010s, 
According to a report in 2020, it found that The amount of Australian agricultural land in foreign ownership of total land increased slightly, from 13.4 to 13.8 percent.

A 2016, Lowy Institute poll found that 87% of respondents were against the Federal Government allowing foreign companies to buy Australian agricultural land a 6% points higher than a similar survey four years ago.

A 2022 ABC's Vote Compass Poll found that 88% of Australians want tighter controls on foreign ownership of farm land which is an increase from compass poll results in 2013 and 2016.

See also
 Effects of global warming on agriculture in Australia
 History of wheat industry regulation in Australia
 Wheatbelt

References

External links

 Farm Facts 2011
 Agricultural Statistics - Australian Bureau of Statistics page.
 Peterborough
 SA History - Goyder
 The History Trust of South Australia has a map of Goyder's Line.
 Agricultural industry strength in Australia